Municipal elections were held in the Czech Republic on 20 October and 21 October 2006. The Civic Democratic Party received 35% of the vote, winning more seats than any other party.

Results

References

2006
2006 elections in the Czech Republic
October 2006 events in Europe